Milne Norman McCooke (9 October 1934 – 23 December 2010) was an Australian rules footballer who played with St Kilda in the Victorian Football League (VFL).

McCooke, a Caulfield City recruit, made his debut for St Kilda in the 1955 VFL season. Used mostly as a follower or forward, McCooke kicked three goals for St Kilda in his second league game, a win over North Melbourne at Junction Oval, which ended a 12-game losing streak. He played seven games that season, then only seconds fixtures in 1956, followed by three senior appearances in 1957 and another three in 1958.

The next stage of his career was spent at Oakleigh in the Victorian Football Association (VFA), where he was a premiership player in 1960 and won a best and fairest award in 1962.

McCooke was coach of Wimmera Football League club Murtoa from 1964 to 1967, before spending a season at VFA club Caulfield, playing three games in an injury and suspension affected year.

In 1969 McCooke led a young Kooweerup side to a 25-point grand final victory over Longwarry at Cora Lynn football ground and coached the Caulfield reserves in 1975 and Victorian Amateur Football Association (VAFA) club Ormond Amateurs in 1978. His son, Steve McCooke, was an Ormond Amateurs player, but is best known as a cricketer, with three Sheffield Shield appearances for Victoria.

References

Sources
 Holmesby, R. & Main, J. (2014). The Encyclopedia of AFL Footballers: every AFL/VFL player since 1897 (10th ed.). Melbourne, Victoria: Bas Publishing. 
 Piesse, K. (2010) The Bears Uncensored, Cricketbooks.com.au: Melbourne. 

1934 births
Australian rules footballers from Victoria (Australia)
St Kilda Football Club players
Oakleigh Football Club players
Caulfield Football Club players
2010 deaths